K. R. Pura or Krishnarajapura is an Assembly constituency in the Greater Bangalore region and has the largest number of voters among the 21 constituencies. It comes under Bangalore North Lok Sabha. Carved out from the erstwhile Varthur constituency, and a few parts of Hosakote constituency, it has predominantly urban characteristics.

Ward map of K. R. Pura Assembly

All wards of the erstwhile K. R. Puram City Municipal Council, and wards 3 to 11 of Mahadevapura City Municipal Council, which includes Sanna Thimmanahalli, Medahalli, Bhattrahalli, K. R. Puram, Ramamurthy Nagar, Doorvaninagar, Chikkabasavanapura, Devasandra, Vijnanapura, A. Narayanapura, Singayyanapalya, Annayyanapalya, Mahadevapura, Benniganahalli, Vibhuthipura and Vimanapura now come under K R Pura Assembly.

As many as 10 villages, K. Narayanapura, Kottanur, N. Nagenahalli, Kyalasanahalli, Geddalahalli, Horamavu Agara, K. Channasandra, Kalkere, Horamavu and Chalkere, that were included within the Bruhat Bangalore Mahanagara Palike limits when the Greater Bangalore area was formed, are also part of this constituency.

The area has its own set of problems. Traffic congestion, sewage disposal issues, lack of storm-water drains and bad roads are common complaints.

Following are the Wards which come under K. R. Pura Assembly constituency:

Civic Administration
K R Pura comes under Bangalore North (Lok Sabha constituency) led by MP D. V. Sadananda Gowda who was also the ex Chief Minister of Karnataka. During the general elections 2014 D. V. Sadananda Gowda contesting through BJP won with 52.91% majority defeating C. Narayanaswamy of INC. MLA B.A. Basavaraj won contesting through INC the 2013 Karnataka Legislative Assembly election from K R Pura by a margin of 24001 votes defeating N S Nandiesha Reddy of BJP.

Vidhan Sabha Members
K. R. Pura seat did not exist in the 12th Legislative assembly (2004-2008) and parts of it were inside Hosakote & Varathur assembly.  Varathur assembly was split into two (Mahadevapura & K. R. Pura) by 2008; K. R. Pura since has participated in the 13th, 14th & 15th Karnataka Legislative Assembly elections. 

 Until 2008 : The seat did not exist.  
 2008 (13-th Vidhan Sabha) : Nandiesha Reddy  (BJP)
 2013 :  B.A. Basavaraj (Congress)
 2018 :  B.A. Basavaraj (Congress)
 2019 (by-poll) :  B.A. Basavaraj (BJP)

See also
List of constituencies of the Karnataka Legislative Assembly
Bangalore Urban district

References

 

Bangalore Urban district
Assembly constituencies of Karnataka